Herman S. Parish III is an American children's writer, the current author of Amelia Bedelia children's books and the nephew of the series creator Peggy Parish.

Life and career
Parish was born in Texas. His father served in the US Air Force. He was in the fourth grade when the first Amelia Bedelia book was written. Having grown up with his aunt’s tales of Amelia Bedelia’s humorous misadventures, Herman decided to carry on the legacy after his aunt’s death in 1988. He did not wish to entrust the future of the series into the hands of a children’s author outside of the family.  Since Peggy had the summers off from teaching, she was able to stay with the Parish family for extended periods of time, allowing Herman and Peggy to develop a close relationship. More importantly, this gave Herman a chance to keenly observe Peggy during her writing processes, gaining great insight into the road ahead of him.

To carry on the essence of the series, Herman thoroughly examined his aunt’s work and did his best to capture what exactly made the character of Amelia Bedelia such a hit. In an interview with Publishers Weekly, Herman noted he didn't want to simply copy his aunt's style of "Amelia being given a list of things to do, but then being left alone to interpret it literally and run amuck," but chose to "have her have face-to-face misunderstandings instead." Having editor Susan Hirschman and illustrator Lynn Sweat in common with his aunt, helped make the transition. Herman is a resident of Princeton, New Jersey, and travels to libraries and elementary schools across the United States, speaking to young children.  The importance of revising and editing is often stressed during these lectures. He has presented to students in more than 22 states.

In May 2014, Parish collapsed at his home, suffering a hemorrhagic stroke. He spent 17 days in the intensive care unit at Robert Wood Johnson University Hospital in New Brunswick, New Jersey, and later dedicated Amelia Bedelia Cleans Up to two of his physicians.

Select works

Amelia Bedelia
Good Driving, Amelia Bedelia (1995)
Bravo, Amelia Bedelia! (1997)
Amelia Bedelia 4 Mayor (1999)
Calling Doctor Amelia Bedelia (2002)
Amelia Bedelia, Bookworm (2003)
Amelia Bedelia and the Christmas List* (2003)
Amelia Bedelia Goes Back to School* (2004)
Happy Haunting, Amelia Bedelia (2004)
Be My Valentine, Amelia Bedelia* (2005)
Amelia Bedelia, Rocket Scientist? (2005)
Amelia Bedelia Under Construction (2006)
Amelia Bedelia's Masterpiece (2007)
Amelia Bedelia and the Cat (2008)
Amelia Bedelia Talks Turkey (2008)
Amelia Bedelia Bakes Off (2010)
Go West, Amelia Bedelia! (2011)
Amelia Bedelia Cub Reporter (2012)
Good Work, Amelia Bedelia!(2012)

Young Amelia Bedelia
Amelia Bedelia's First Day of School (2009)
Amelia Bedelia's First Valentine (2009)
Amelia Bedelia's First Apple Pie (2010)
Amelia Bedelia's First Field Trip (2011)
Amelia Bedelia Makes a Friend (2011)
Amelia Bedelia's First Vote (2012)
Amelia Bedelia Sleeps Over (2012)
Amelia Bedelia Hits the Trail (2013)
Amelia Bedelia Means Business (2013, chapter book)
Amelia Bedelia Unleashed (2013, chapter book)
Amelia Bedelia's First Library Card (2013)
Amelia Bedelia Road Trip! (2013, chapter book)
Amelia Bedelia Tries Her Luck (2013)
Amelia Bedelia Goes Wild (2014, chapter book)
Amelia Bedelia Shapes Up (2014, chapter book)
Amelia Bedelia Cleans Up (2015, chapter book)
Amelia Bedelia Sets Sail (2015, chapter book)
Amelia Bedelia Dances Off (2015, chapter book)
Amelia Bedelia On the Job (2016, chapter book)
Amelia Bedelia Ties the Knot (2016, chapter book)
Amelia Bedelia Makes a Splash (2017, chapter book)

Published by Greenwillow Books, an imprint of HarperCollins Publishers. Gatefold books (*) are published by HarperFestival.

References

External links
Amelia Bedelia Books Official Website
 

 

Living people
American children's writers
People from Princeton, New Jersey
Writers from New Jersey
Place of birth missing (living people)
Year of birth missing (living people)